Darwinula is a genus of ostracods belonging to the family Darwinulidae.

Species:
 Darwinula aurea
 Darwinula stevensoni (Brady & Robertson, 1870)

References

Podocopida
Podocopida genera